Lakhyayta is a village in Berrechid Province, Casablanca-Settat, Morocco. It was formerly also the name of a rural commune in Settat Province of the Chaouia-Ouardigha region. At the time of the 2004 census, the commune had a total population of 17,538 people living in 2956 households.

References

Populated places in Berrechid Province